Catriona lonca  is a species of sea slug, an aeolid nudibranch, a marine gastropod mollusk in the family Trinchesiidae.

Distribution
This species was described from Ngemelis Island, Palau, Micronesia.

References

Trinchesiidae
Gastropods described in 1965